The Messerschmitt Kabinenroller (Messerschmitt Cabin Scooter) was a series of microcars made by RSM 
Messerschmitt from 1953 to 1956 and by Fahrzeug- und Maschinenbau GmbH, Regensburg (FMR) from 1956 to 1964. All the Messerschmitt and FMR production cars used the Kabinenroller's monocoque structure, featuring tandem seating and usually a bubble canopy.

The Kabinenroller platform was used for four microcars, the three-wheeled Messerschmitt KR175 (1953-1955), Messerschmitt KR200 (1955-1964) and Messerschmitt KR201, and the four-wheeled FMR Tg500 (1957-1961).  The platform and all four cars using it were designed by Fritz Fend.

History
The Kabinenroller was designed and developed by Fritz Fend for Messerschmitt AG.  Fend had earlier designed and built a series of unpowered and powered invalid carriages, leading up to his Fend Flitzer. Fend noticed that able-bodied people were buying Flitzers for use as personal transport. This led him to believe that a mass-produced two-seat version of the Flitzer would have a ready market. A search for a manufacturer interested in the project led him to Messerschmitt, who had him develop the project for production in their Regensburg factory.

The Kabinenroller was designed and developed for production in 1952 and 1953. Production of the original version, the KR175, began in February 1953. 70 modifications had been made to the design by June 1953.

The KR200 was developed on the Kabinenroller platform and replaced the KR175 in 1955. Based on the same frame and an evolution of the original suspension, the KR200 had a large number of detail changes. On 29–30 August 1955, a modified KR200 with a tuned engine, revised gear ratios, redundant control cables, a one-off streamlined body, and stock suspension, damping, steering, and brakes, was run at the Hockenheimring for twenty-four hours.

Design

Frame
The Kabinenroller was based on a central monocoque tub made from pressed steel sheet and tubular steel.
The earlier Kr175 had triangular form of steel reinforced floor.   The tub tapered upward from front to rear with a bulkhead at the back. The bulkhead supported a tubular steel subframe and acted as the firewall.  The subframe supported the engine and the rear suspension. The engine cover was hinged to the monocoque structure. The fuel tank was in the top of the engine cover and fed the carburettor by gravity.

The monocoque tub, with the bulkhead at the back, a nose section at the front, and an access hatch system overhead, formed a passenger compartment for a driver and a passenger sitting in tandem. The base plate on which the hatch was hinged was riveted to the right side of the monocoque tub and the nose section.  The hatch was made of a steel sheet base with a glass windshield, a plexiglas bubble canopy, and a framed set of sliding windows on either side of the canopy.

The tandem seating allowed the body to be long and narrow, with a low frontal area. This also allowed the body to taper like an aircraft fuselage, within a practical length.

Suspension
Front suspension of the Kr 200 Kabinenroller (the Kr175 had a different arrangement with rubber cones) was by a transverse lower arm sprung by a torsional 3-element rubber spring at the inside end.  Front suspension travel was limited by rubber buffers. Rear suspension was by a trailing arm similar to a single-sided motorcycle swingarm which also formed the enclosure for the chain drive to the rear wheel. The trailing arm was suspended by another torsional rubber spring. Hydraulic dampers were added to the design with the introduction of the KR200 in 1955; also the front track was increased at that time.

Steering

The shaft of the steering control was connected directly to the track rods controlling the front wheels, resulting in approximately one-third of a turn from the left extreme to the right extreme ("lock to lock"). The handlebar-shaped steering control would be operated with small, controlled inputs by swivelling the steering bar about its axis from the horizontal (straight-ahead) position instead of rotating it as with a conventional steering wheel.

Tg500 sports car

The performance of the record car persuaded Fend to design a sports car based on the Kabinenroller platform. The FMR Tg500 was introduced in 1958, two years after Fahrzeug- und Maschinenbau Gmbh, Regensburg (FMR) took over production of the Kabinenroller from Messerschmitt. The Tg500 used the Kabinenroller's unit body, front bodywork, front suspension, and steering system, but the rear subframe and bodywork were completely different.

The Tg500's most noticeable difference from other Kabinenrollern is its pair of rear wheels. These were driven by halfshafts with universal joints at both ends and a sliding spline allowing the length of the shaft to vary, accommodating changes in camber angle. The wheels were suspended by control arms and coil springs with concentric hydraulic shock absorbers. The rear track was 

The tubular subframe to which the rear suspension was attached also held the drivetrain, which consisted of a transversely-mounted FMR 500 L straight-twin two-stroke engine and an unsynchronized four-speed transaxle with a reverse gear.

It also used larger tires, 4.40 x 10 to the KR200's 4.40 x 8, and four-wheel hydraulic brakes.

References

Citations

Bibliography

External links

Microcars